Črna may refer to several places in Slovenia: 

Črna, Idrija,  a formerly independent settlement, now part of Dole
Črna pri Kamniku, a village in the Municipality of Kamnik
Municipality of Črna na Koroškem, a municipality in northern Slovenia
Črna na Koroškem, a town in northern Slovenia, seat of the municipality